Těchonín is a municipality and village in Ústí nad Orlicí District in the Pardubice Region of the Czech Republic. It has about 600 inhabitants.

Administrative parts
Villages of Celné and Stanovník are administrative parts of Těchonín.

Economy
A BSL-4 biosafety facility, Centre of Biological Protection, is located here.

References

External links

 

Villages in Ústí nad Orlicí District